SS Michael may refer to:

 , of the s, which served in the U.S. Navy during World War II
 , a steamer bought in 1906 by the Bank of Athens and renamed Michael

Ship names